Roger Nilsen (born 8 August 1969) is a Norwegian football coach and former player. A defender, he played for the Norwegian clubs Tromsø, Viking, Molde and Bryne, and spent time abroad at 1. FC Köln, Sheffield United, Tottenham Hotspur and Grazer AK. He made 32 appearances and scored three goals for Norway. He later worked as assistant coach at Viking.

Club career

Viking FK
Born in Tromsø, Nilsen's career began in Tromsø, but it was after he moved on to Viking that he became established, winning Tippeligaen, the Norwegian top division in 1991. In his four seasons at Viking, Nilsen successfully became a regular in Norway's U21 team, and won his first senior cap in 1990. He was loaned to 1. FC Köln, and was put up for sale towards the end of the 1993 season.

Sheffield United
Having already signed Norwegian team-mate Jostein Flo, Sheffield United boss Dave Bassett added Nilsen in November 1993 for the fee of £500,000, beating Aberdeen to his signature. Nilsen joined as the club fought unsuccessfully against relegation from the Premier League, and was a regular at left-back.

A popular figure at Bramall Lane, Nilsen played six seasons under five different managers, with a number of games at centre-back - particularly after United switched to a wing-back formation in 1997/98. He started the 1997 playoff final defeat at Wembley against Crystal Palace, and United's defeat to Newcastle in the FA Cup semi-final in 1998. It was in that cup-run where Nilsen had arguably his most memorable moment, during the quarter-final penalty shootout win over Coventry City. Never scoring for the Blades, and with Gareth Taylor having missed the first United penalty, Nilsen stepped up to convert the second - powering the ball past Steve Ogrizovic to put the Blades 1–0 up.

Nilsen's final appearance came as he helped keep a clean sheet in a 3–0 win over West Brom in Feb 1999, before a surprise return to the Premier League saw him transferred to Tottenham Hotspur on a free.

Later career
After making just two appearances at Spurs, Nilsen had a brief spell at Grazer AK before he returned home to play for Molde and Bryne. He left Bryne in 2003, but continued his career in the Norwegian third division with Stavanger IF.

International career
Nilsen represented Norway at youth international level and played for the under-20 team in the 1989 FIFA World Youth Championship. He played 19 matches and scored two goals for Norway U21.

Nilsen made his debut for the senior team in the friendly match against Cameroon on 31 October 1990. He scored his first goal for Norway against Sweden on 26 August 1992, and scored two goals in the 10–0 win against San Marino two weeks later. Nilsen was a part of the 1994 FIFA World Cup squad, but did not play any matches in the tournament. He played his last match for Norway against Sweden on 4 February 2000. Nilsen was capped a total of 32 times, and scored three goals.

Coaching career
In 2006, he retired and took over as head coach for Stavanger IF, guiding the club to promotion to the second division. At the end of the season, Nilsen left the club to take up the assistant coach position at the Norwegian top-flight side Viking. After manager Uwe Rösler left in November 2009 he was briefly caretaker manager. He was downsized from his assistant job after the 2010 season.

In 2014, he succeeded Odd-Karl Stangnes as manager of IF Fløya's women's team, combined with a teaching job at the Norwegian College of Elite Sports in Tromsø. In September 2018 Nilsen was sacked from his role managing FK Vidar with the club 2nd bottom in the 2nd division.

Personal life
Roger Nilsen is the brother of the former player and coach Steinar Nilsen.

References

1969 births
Living people
Sportspeople from Tromsø
Norwegian footballers
Norway international footballers
Norway youth international footballers
Norway under-21 international footballers
Association football defenders
Tromsø IL players
Viking FK players
1. FC Köln players
Sheffield United F.C. players
Tottenham Hotspur F.C. players
Grazer AK players
Molde FK players
Bryne FK players
Eliteserien players
Bundesliga players
Premier League players
1994 FIFA World Cup players
Kniksen Award winners
Expatriate footballers in Germany
Expatriate footballers in England
Expatriate footballers in Austria
Norwegian expatriate sportspeople in Germany
Norwegian expatriate sportspeople in England
Norwegian expatriate sportspeople in Austria
Norwegian expatriate footballers
Norwegian football managers
Viking FK non-playing staff